António José Cardoso de Oliveira (born 9 October 1982), sometimes known as Toni, is a Portuguese football manager and former player who played as a central defender. He is the current head coach of Brazilian club Coritiba.

Playing career
Born in Lisbon, Toni was a S.L. Benfica youth graduate. He made his senior debut with the reserves in the 2001–02 season, in Segunda Divisão B.

In July 2004, after a one-year spell at S.C. Braga B, Toni signed for Segunda Liga side C.D. Santa Clara. He made his professional debut on 18 September, coming on as a second-half substitute for Kali in a 1–3 away loss against Varzim S.C.

After being rarely used, Toni subsequently represented Casa Pia A.C., Clube Oriental de Lisboa and G.D. Fabril, retiring with the latter in 2011 at the age of just 29.

Coaching career
In late January 2014, after being a coach of A.D. Oeiras' under-19 squad, Oliveira moved to Iran to join his father's staff at Tractor Sazi F.C. In January 2017, he was named Vanja Radinović's assistant at NK Rudar Velenje.

In 2017, Oliveira rejoined his father's staff, now at Kazma SC. Both left the club in 2019, and in December of that year, he became Jesualdo Ferreira's assistant at Santos FC of the Campeonato Brasileiro Série A.

On 22 October 2020, Oliveira was appointed assistant coach of Paulo Autuori at Athletico Paranaense. The following 6 February, he was named coach of the under-23 squad for the 2021 Campeonato Paranaense.

On 13 March 2021, Oliveira was named coach of Athletico's first team, with Bruno Lazaroni taking his previous role. He resigned on 9 September, after six winless matches.

On 5 January 2022, Oliveira was appointed manager of Benfica B, until the end of the 2021–22 season. He left the side in May, as his contract would not be renewed.

On 2 June 2022, Oliveira agreed to return to Brazil, and was named head coach of Cuiabá in the top tier. He left the club at the end of the season, after not renewing his contract, and took over fellow league team Coritiba on 13 December.

Personal life
Oliveira's father, also named António, was also a footballer. A midfielder, he had his career mainly associated to Benfica. His son, also António, was also a midfielder, but only played youth football and notably represented Casa Pia.

Managerial statistics

References

External links

1982 births
Living people
Footballers from Lisbon
Portuguese footballers
Association football defenders
Liga Portugal 2 players
S.L. Benfica B players
S.C. Braga B players
C.D. Santa Clara players
Casa Pia A.C. players
Clube Oriental de Lisboa players
G.D. Fabril players
Portuguese football managers
Santos FC non-playing staff
Club Athletico Paranaense managers
S.L. Benfica B managers
Cuiabá Esporte Clube managers
Coritiba Foot Ball Club managers
Campeonato Brasileiro Série A managers
Liga Portugal 2 managers
Portuguese expatriate football managers
Portuguese expatriate sportspeople in Brazil
Expatriate football managers in Brazil